Bossiaea inundata is a species of flowering plant in the family Fabaceae and is endemic to the Murchison River Gorge in Western Australia. It is a spreading, openly-branched shrub with oblong, elliptic or egg-shaped leaves with the narrower end towards the base, and deep yellow and red flowers.

Description
Flowering occurs from May to September.

Taxonomy and naming
Bossiaea inundata was first formally described in 2006 by James Henderson Ross in the journal Muelleria from specimens collected in the bed of the Murchison River upstream from the Ross Graham lookout in 1998. The specific epithet (inundata) refers to the habitat of this species that results in the plants sometimes being inundated.

Distribution and habitat
This bossiaea grows in the bed and on the banks of the Murchison River in the Geraldton Sandplains biogeographic region in the west of Western Australia.

Conservation status
Bossiaea inundata is classified as "Priority Two" by the Western Australian Government Department of Parks and Wildlife meaning that it is poorly known and from only one or a few locations.

References

inundata
Mirbelioids
Flora of Western Australia
Plants described in 2006